Ngeremasch (also spelled Ngaramasch) is a village in Palau, and the capital of the state of Angaur. Ngaramasch is located west of the runway of Angaur, there are also ferries that connect Angaur to Koror. The population in 2009 was 135. The village was formerly known as Saipan Town.

Angaur
Populated places in Palau